Maria Cattarina Locatelli (or Lucatelli; died 1723) was an Italian painter. A native of Bologna, she was a pupil of Ludovico Pasinelli. She painted a St. Anthony and St. Theresa for the church of the Madonna di San Columbano. She died in 1723.

References
 

1723 deaths
18th-century Italian painters
Painters from Bologna
Italian Baroque painters
Italian women painters
Year of birth unknown
18th-century Italian women artists
17th-century Italian women artists